The Ukrainian Army Aviation ) is a military aviation of the Ukrainian Ground Forces.

History
The first formations of army aviation in the revived Ukrainian were formed in 1992 when the former Soviet 119th Regiment joined the Ukrainian military.

In 2014 the 16th Brigade participated in the liberation of Slovyansk.

International missions

Structure
Structure:
 8th Command Post, Chernihiv
 11th Separate Army Aviation Brigade "Kherson", Kherson International Airport (Chornobaivka) attached to 6th Corps 
 1st Squadron (Mi 2, Mi-8 & Mi-24)
 2nd Squadron (Mi 2, Mi-8 & Mi-24)
 12th Separate Army Aviation Brigade "Maj Gen Viktor Pavlenko", Novyi Kalyniv Air Base attached to 13th Corps
 1st Squadron (Mi 2, Mi-8 & Mi-24)
 2nd Squadron (Mi 2, Mi-8 & Mi-24)
 16th Separate Army Aviation Brigade "Brody", Brody Air Base attached to 8th Corps
 1st Squadron (Mi 2, Mi-8 & Mi-24)
 2nd Squadron (Mi 2, Mi-8 & Mi-24)
 18th Separate Army Aviation Brigade "Ihor Sikorsky", Poltava Air Base (formed 2015)
 1st Squadron (Mi-2)
 2nd Squadron (Mi-8)
 3rd Squadron (Mi-24)
 18th Separate Helicopter Detachment supporting United Nations Organization Stabilization Mission in the Democratic Republic of the Congo (MONUSCO).
 57th Aviation Base, Brody Air Base

References

Army aviation
Military units and formations established in 1992
Army Aviation
Aviation in Ukraine